Michael Howard Kay Ph.D FBCS (born 11 October 1951) is the editor of the W3C XSLT 2.0 and 3.0 language specifications for performing XML transformations, and the developer of the Saxon XSLT and XQuery processing software.

Early life

Michael Kay is the son of Ronald Kay (1920-2019) and Alma Brigitte Kay (née Albert) (1924-2019). His father was English, his mother German; he was born in Germany but has always lived in England.

Kay was educated at Salesian College in Farnborough, and then went to Trinity College, Cambridge to read Natural Sciences. He gained his Doctor of Philosophy degree while working in the Computer Laboratory, University of Cambridge under the supervision of Maurice Wilkes on databases.

Career
Kay spent over twenty years (1977-2001) with the British computer manufacturer International Computers Limited (ICL). He was appointed an ICL Fellow in 1990. On leaving ICL, he worked for three years with Software AG before forming his own company, Saxonica. He has previously been involved in GedML: Genealogical Data in XML.

Publications
Kay is the author of the book XSLT: Programmer's Reference by Wrox Press and several other books and papers on software engineering. He lives and works in Reading, England and is a member of the XML Guild and a regular speaker at the XML Summer School in Oxford and Balisage Markup conference.

References

1951 births
Living people
Alumni of Trinity College, Cambridge
ICL Fellows
International Computers Limited people
XML Guild
Fellows of the British Computer Society
People educated at Salesian College, Farnborough